Símun Samuelsen (born 21 May 1985 in Vágur) is a retired Faroese football striker who played as a right or left winger and current head coach of AB Argir.

Career

Club career
He made his debut in Faroe Islands Premier League Football with VB Vágur in the 2001 season, playing 3 games. After four more seasons at home, Samuelsen moved to Icelandic side Keflavík ÍF and in August 2007 went on loan to Norwegian First Division side Notodden FK. He is currently back playing for HB Tórshavn. On 20 July 2010 he scored a goal for HB Tórshavn in the UEFA Champions League match against FC Red Bull Salzburg, the match was played in Tórshavn. HB Tórshavn lost the first match against FC Red Bull Salzburg 5-0.

International career
Samuelsen made his debut for the Faroe Islands in an April 2003 friendly match against Kazakhstan. He has collected 44 caps since, and scored one goal.

Coaching career
Retiring at the end of 2019, Samuelsen was appointed head coach of his former club, AB Argir, on 26 March 2020.

International goals
Scores and results list Faroe Islands' goal tally first.

Individual Honours
Effodeildin Team of the Season: 2012, 2013

References

External links
 
 
 Símun Samuelsen back home to the Faroe Islands (In Faroese).
 

Association football forwards
1985 births
Living people
Faroese footballers
Faroese expatriate footballers
Faroe Islands international footballers
VB Vágur players
Knattspyrnudeild Keflavík players
Notodden FK players
GÍ Gøta players
FC Suðuroy players
Havnar Bóltfelag players
Argja Bóltfelag players
Norwegian First Division players
People from Vágur
Faroese expatriate sportspeople in Iceland
Faroese expatriate sportspeople in Norway
Expatriate footballers in Iceland
Expatriate footballers in Norway
Faroese football managers
Argja Bóltfelag managers